Community Theatre of Little Rock is a non-profit organization based in Little Rock, Arkansas and founded in 1956. It is a completely volunteer-driven organization.

History 
Founded in 1956, Community Theatre of Little Rock (CTLR) is Central Arkansas' Oldest and finest theater tradition.

Since its inception, CTLR has performed in many venues in Little Rock. In the very early years, The Parish Hall at 9th and Louisiana, Trinity Parish Hall, Robinson (Center) Auditorium, a renovated feedstore at 609 Center Street and The Medical Center Auditorium provided performance stages. In the 1960s and 1970s, National Investors Life Building, the Arkansas Arts Center, Student Union became venues. The 1980s found the troupe performing again in the Arkansas Arts Center, UALR, the UALR, The Arkansas Repertory Theatre, Little Rock Garden Council and Hall High School. Capital Keyboard Theatre became home until the Arkansas School for the Blind offered the use of Woolly Auditorium from 2002 to 2008. In 2008 Community Theatre of Little Rock moved to the PUBLIC Theatre and stayed there until July 1, 2014, when they joined The Studio Theatre and Lobby Bar in the heart of Downtown Little Rock, Arkansas.

Current venue 
In the Summer of 2014, Community Theatre of Little Rock broke ties with The PUBLIC Theatre and joined The Studio Theatre and Lobby Bar.

Programs 
Community Theatre of Little Rock has presented over 200 mainstage productions since its inception in 1956. Future endeavors include classes in basic acting, dance, singing, set design/construction, and prop manufacturing.

Productions - a few examples

1950s
 Biggest Thief in Town
 Wake Up, Darling
 Dracula
 Roomful of Roses

1960s
 Agatha Christie's The Moustrap 
 Glass Menagerie
 You Can't Take it With You
 Gypsy

1970s
 If Men Played Cards as Women Do
 The Caine Mutiny Court Martial
 Hello, Dolly!
 The Miracle Worker

1980s
 Annie Get Your Gun
 The Dining Room
 The Curse of An Aching Heart
 Damn Yankees

1990s
 Our Town
 A Murder is Announced
 On Golden Pond
 The Man Who Came To Dinner

2000s
 Cotton Patch Gospel
 Once Upon a Mattress
 Arsenic & Old Lace
 Scrooge: The Musical

2010s
 Five Women Wearing the Same Dress
 Dirty Rotten Scoundrels
 The Crucible
 A Few Good Men
 Moonlight and Magnolias
 Hairspray

References 
Big Hair, Big Flair The John Hughes-inspired '80s show hits Community Theatre. By Shea Stewart July 14, 2009
Making the Scene Volunteers set the stage for community theaters from Cabot to Conway. By Spencer Watson May 10, 2011
The Force Behind the Public Theatre By Ronald Sitton  Little Rock Free Press published March 1-31, 2004  
THEATER: The Odd Couple gains a feminine perspective By Jack Hill Arkansas Democrat Gazett published Friday, April 11, 2008.
"I Cain't Say No" video short Taltopia.com 2003.Friday, October 24, 2008.
Community Theatre opens Fourth Wall By The Arkansas Democrat-Gazette Arkansas Democrat Gazett Friday, October 24, 2008.
THE COMMUNITY THEATRE OF LITTLE ROCK REVISITS CONJUNCTION JUNCTION WITH SCHOOLHOUSE ROCK LIVE, TOO! / Little Rock KATV Channel 7 Calendar of Events 7/18 to 7/27/08.
Not So Sweet "Sweet Charity" by Joy Ritchey Arkansas Times October 22nd, 2006.
Musical Tells Story of Pioneer Life Through Quilts The Department of Arkansas Heritage January 12, 2004.
50 years of Community Theatre by Jessica Sardashti Arkansas Times, March 2006.

External links 
Community Theatre of Little Rock official site

1956 establishments in Arkansas
Theatre companies in Arkansas
Non-profit organizations based in Arkansas
Theatres in Arkansas
Arkansas articles needing attention
Buildings and structures in Little Rock, Arkansas
Tourist attractions in Little Rock, Arkansas
Performing groups established in 1956